

Pre-production
These positions are responsible for the development of a production from conception to performance. Typically, although there will be 
significant involvement in the fabrication and initial development, these positions will not be involved in the performances.
 
Producer
Director
Playwright
Dramaturge
Scenic designer
Scenographer
Lighting designer
Costume designer
Set designer
Sound designer
Composer
Music director
Choreographer
directive movement
Fight director
Intimacy coordinator

Production
These positions are responsible for the fabrication of a production 
prior to the initial performance. Although there will be significant 
involvement in initial development of a production, some of these 
positions may not be involved once performances before an audience 
begin.

Actor
Audio engineer
Backstage
Carpenter and master carpenter
Charge artist
Dancer
Electrician
Fight director
Front of house manager
Intimacy director
Lighting technician
Master electrician
Musician
Paint crew
Playbill writer
Production manager
Property master
Publicist
Sound Engineer
Sound Technician (A1)
Sound Technician (A2)
Scenic artist
Stagehands
Stage manager
ASM(Assistant Stage Manager)
Technical director
Theatrical technician
Wardrobe supervisor

Theatre staff
These staff members are responsible for running a theatre group from year to year.  Their objective is to facilitate the success of individual productions.  Staff positions help ensure good attendance in safe facilities. They help ensure the theatre remains financially solvent, that it is well run, and that it is perceived as an asset to the community it serves.

Artistic director
Theater manager, the administrator of the theater, also called general manager, managing director, or intendant (UK English); often also has the responsibilities of an artistic director 
Director of production
Music Director
Technical director
Costume director
Marketing director
Director of public relations
Director of audience services
Director of development
Director of special events
Dramaturge
Literary manager
Company manager
House manager
Usher
Ticketing agent
Crew chief
Janitor
Dresser
Stage crew
Fly crew
Light board operator
Spotlight operator
Grips
Call boy, a stagehand who alerts actors and actresses of their entrances during a performance
Wardrobe Crew

See also
Character actor
Pantomime dame
Stagehand
Running crew

 
Stagecraft
 
Personnel
Lists of occupations